Hans Thoresen (born 1767 - died 1840) was a Norwegian timber merchant and ship-owner in Christiania (now Oslo), Norway. He became a burgher in Christiania in 1790 and built a large timber business in the city.

He was born at Degrum in the parish of Enebakk in Akershus,  Norway. He was a well known public figure in Christiania during  his lifetime. He bought the Sommerro estate from Bernt Anker, now part of the grounds surrounding the Norwegian Royal Palace in Oslo. In 1810 he bought  Skinderstuen  where the Norwegian Nobel Institute is found today.

He married Anna Ramstad  on 17 February 1816 in Christiania. Their daughter Augusta (1822-1875) married Lutheran theologian, Bernhard Cathrinus Pauss during 1865 in Geneva.

A painting of him from 1839 by Johan Gørbitz is owned by Oslo Museum.

He should not be confused with timber merchant in Christiania Hans Thorn Thoresen (1761–1823).

References

19th-century Norwegian businesspeople
1765 births
1840 deaths
People from Enebakk
Norwegian merchants
Norwegian businesspeople in timber
Ship owners
Norwegian businesspeople in shipping